Ushangi Kokauri (born 10 January 1992) is an Azerbaijani judoka of Georgian origin, acting in the weight category over 100 kg, member of the national team of Azerbaijan in judo. Ushangi representing Azerbaijan at the 2016 Summer Olympics in Rio de Janeiro. He competed at the 2016 Summer Olympics in the men's +100 kg event, in which he was eliminated in the second round by Hisayoshi Harasawa.

Biography
Ushangi Kokauri born 10 January 1992 in Georgia.
In 2009, 2010 and 2011 he won Georgian youth judo championship.
In 2012 he won the bronze medal in the championship of Georgia among adults.
In November 2015 IJF Oceania Cup in Wollongong (Australia) won a silver medal. In the same year he won the bronze medal at the IJF African Cup in Port Louis.
In February 2016 won a bronze medal at the IJF European Cup in Prague and gold – in Oberwart. In March of the same year he won the IJF African Cup in Casablanca.
In April of the same in 2016 he won the bronze medal of the European Judo Championships in Kazan in the team standings.
In May 2016, he was ranked 23rd in the world rankings. It was his best result in the world rankings.

References

External links

 
 
 

1992 births
Living people
Azerbaijani male judoka
Olympic judoka of Azerbaijan
Judoka at the 2016 Summer Olympics
Judoka at the 2015 European Games
European Games competitors for Georgia (country)
European Games competitors for Azerbaijan
Judoka at the 2019 European Games
Judoka at the 2020 Summer Olympics
21st-century Azerbaijani people